Tamahere is a locality (located on a semi-rural ward that bears the same name) within Waikato District, New Zealand; on the outskirts of Hamilton.  The majority of the Ward is zoned as Country Living, with a minimum lot size of 0.5ha.  The landscape is dominated by several large gully systems that contribute to the  Waikato River.

Communities
Alongside the village proper, the ward of Tamahere also includes the locality of The Narrows. In 2019, a new recreational reserve (Tamahere Park) was opened and includes sports fields for cricket, rugby, junior soccer and La Crosse.  Destination playground and skate-park were jointly funded by community funds and Waikato District Council.  A commercial hub was also added, due to be completed in 2020, including a 4 Square supermarket, a medical centre, a pharmacy, and a bakery, Waikato council office and serviced offices.

Demographics

Tamahere had a population of 6,126 at the 2018 New Zealand census, an increase of 1,164 people (23.5%) since the 2013 census, and an increase of 2,097 people (52.0%) since the 2006 census. There were 1,977 households, comprising 2,982 males and 3,144 females, giving a sex ratio of 0.95 males per female, with 1,314 people (21.4%) aged under 15 years, 912 (14.9%) aged 15 to 29, 2,832 (46.2%) aged 30 to 64, and 1,065 (17.4%) aged 65 or older.

Ethnicities were 87.9% European/Pākehā, 8.5% Māori, 1.1% Pacific peoples, 8.4% Asian, and 2.2% other ethnicities. People may identify with more than one ethnicity.

The percentage of people born overseas was 20.8, compared with 27.1% nationally.

Although some people chose not to answer the census's question about religious affiliation, 48.0% had no religion, 42.4% were Christian, 0.2% had Māori religious beliefs, 1.1% were Hindu, 0.5% were Muslim, 0.5% were Buddhist and 1.8% had other religions.

Of those at least 15 years old, 1,668 (34.7%) people had a bachelor's or higher degree, and 540 (11.2%) people had no formal qualifications. 1,566 people (32.5%) earned over $70,000 compared to 17.2% nationally. The employment status of those at least 15 was that 2,391 (49.7%) people were employed full-time, 813 (16.9%) were part-time, and 90 (1.9%) were unemployed.

Tamahere coolstore explosion 

On 5 April 2008 a coolstore caught fire and one fireman was killed and seven injured, when  of a propane and ethane refrigerant exploded. The site is being developed in to housing.

Education

All these schools are co-educational. Rolls are as of 

Tamahere also has three pre-schools.

References

External links
 Tamahere Forum

Populated places in Waikato
Waikato District
Populated places on the Waikato River